Adrian Vera (born January 13, 1997) is an American professional soccer player.

Career 

Vera signed with LA Galaxy II on July 20, 2015.

In March 2021, after six seasons with LA Galaxy II, Vera joined Rio Grande Valley FC ahead of the 2021 season.

On August 3, 2022, Vera joined USL League One side Central Valley Fuego.

References

External links 
 Galaxy Academy Profile

1997 births
Living people
American soccer players
Association football midfielders
Central Valley Fuego FC players
LA Galaxy II players
People from Norwalk, California
Rio Grande Valley FC Toros players
Soccer players from California
Sportspeople from Los Angeles County, California
USL Championship players
USL League One players